Frankenia portulacifolia, also called Saint Helena tea or tea plant, is a species of salt-tolerant plant in the Frankeniaceae family. It is endemic to the islands of Saint Helena, Ascension and Tristan da Cunha. Its natural habitats are inhospitable, dry and rocky areas and rocky shores, often on weathered volcanic ash. As its total population has been estimated at only around 3,500 individuals, it is currently classified as Critically Endangered by the IUCN.

References

Flora of Saint Helena
portulacifolia
Vulnerable plants
Taxonomy articles created by Polbot
Plants described in 1816